Baroan Tagro (born 4/5 October 1977 in Ivory Coast) is a French retired footballer who is last known to have worked as head coach of Noisiel in 2014.

Career
Tagro started his senior career with Dijon FCO in 1997. In 2004, he signed for Raith Rovers in the Scottish Football League First Division where he made four appearances and scored zero goals. After that, he played for French club Houilles AC before retiring.

References

External links 
 Promotion 77, toujours le PSG dans la peau… Interview N°85 : Barouan TAGRO (Houilles/Excellence/ex-CFA)
 Worst XI: Raith Rovers 
 at ZeroZero 
 FIFA.com Profile

French footballers
French expatriate footballers
French sportspeople of Ivorian descent
Association football midfielders
Raith Rovers F.C. players
Barnet F.C. players
Stevenage F.C. players
Carshalton Athletic F.C. players
Paris Saint-Germain F.C. players
Dijon FCO players
Expatriate footballers in England
Expatriate footballers in Scotland
1977 births
Living people